Chinese New Zealanders or Sino-New Zealanders are New Zealanders of Chinese ancestry. The largest subset of Asian New Zealanders, many of the Chinese immigrants came from Mainland China, Hong Kong, Taiwan, or other countries that have large populations of Chinese diaspora. Today's Chinese New Zealand group is composed of diasporic communities from Indonesia, Malaysia, Cambodia, Vietnam and Singapore. As of 2018, Chinese New Zealanders account for 4.9% of the population of New Zealand, and are the largest Asian ethnic group in New Zealand, accounting for 36.3% of Asian New Zealanders.

In the 1860s goldrush immigrants from Guangdong arrived. Due to this historical influx, there is still a distinct Chinese community in Dunedin, whose  mayor Peter Chin is of Chinese descent. However, most Chinese New Zealanders live in the North Island, and are of more recent migrant heritage. Chinese people historically faced severe discrimination in New Zealand, through means varying from the head tax to racist violence. In 2002, the New Zealand Government publicly apologised to China for the racism ethnic Chinese were dealt by New Zealand. Chinese people, culture and cuisine have had a profound impact on modern New Zealand, and are today seen as an inextricable and defining part of the country's rich and diverse culture. Chinese New Year is widely celebrated throughout the country, and although no conventional Chinatowns exist anymore, strongholds of ethnic Chinese exist in Auckland, Wellington, Christchurch and Dunedin. Mandarin is New Zealand's fourth-most-spoken language, while various dialects of Chinese make up the second-most spoken group of languages in New Zealand. Many famous and innovative New Zealanders are of Chinese ancestry, such as Roseanne Liang, Meng Foon, Bic Runga, Michelle Ang, Augusta Xu-Holland, Boh Runga, Renee Liang, Rose Lu, Chris Tse and Brent Wong.

Demographics
There were 247,770 people identifying as being part of the Chinese ethnic group at the 2018 New Zealand census, making up 5.3% of New Zealand's population. This is an increase of 76,359 people (44.5%) since the 2013 census, and an increase of 100,200 people (67.9%) since the 2006 census. Some of the increase between the 2013 and 2018 census was due to Statistics New Zealand adding ethnicity data from other sources (previous censuses, administrative data, and imputation) to the 2018 census data to reduce the number of non-responses.

There were 116,220 males and 131,553 females, giving a sex ratio of 0.883 males per female. The median age was 33.1 years, 48,633 people (19.6%) aged under 15 years, 61,002 (24.6%) aged 15 to 29, 114,510 (46.2%) aged 30 to 64, and 23,625 (9.5%) aged 65 or older.

In terms of population distribution, 69.1% of Chinese New Zealanders live in the Auckland region, 18.9% live in the North Island outside the Auckland region, and 11.9% live in the South Island. The Howick local board area of Auckland has the highest concentration of Chinese people at 25.6%, followed by the Upper Harbour local board area (23.6%) and the Puketāpapa local board area (16.5%). Wellington City and Hamilton City have the highest concentration of Chinese people outside of Auckland at 6.3% and 5.8% respectively. The Buller District and Central Hawke's Bay District had the lowest concentrations of Chinese people at 0.3%.

The proportion of Chinese New Zealanders born overseas was 73.3%, compared with 27.1% for all ethnicities. Over half (58.3%) of those born in New Zealand were aged under 15. The majority of Chinese New Zealanders were from Mainland China, Taiwan made up a third of all immigrants and ten percent came from Malaysia. The remainder of Chinese immigrants to New Zealand came from Singapore, Hong Kong, Vietnam, and Indonesia.

Language
English is by far the most widely spoken language among the usually resident Asian population in New Zealand. Nonetheless, the next most common language after English in New Zealand was Yue or Cantonese (16 percent of Asian people with a language) and Northern Chinese/Mandarin (12 percent). Some Chinese New Zealanders also adhere to speaking Malay and Indonesian due to a small influx of Chinese immigrants from Southeast Asia.

New Zealand Chinese Journals (1920–1972)
The NZ Chinese Journals database contains over 16,000 digitised pages from three Chinese-language publications:

 Man Sing Times (1921–1922) 
 New Zealand Chinese Weekly News (1937–1946)
 New Zealand Chinese Growers Monthly Journal (1949 –1972)

Religion

Source: 2013 Census

History

Early immigrants (1865–1945)
Appo Hocton ( Chinese name: 王鶴庭 ）was the first recorded Chinese emigrant to New Zealand, arriving in Nelson on 25 October 1842. The first significant immigration to New Zealand took place on the strength of two invitations from New Zealand's Otago goldmining region to potential goldminers of Guangdong province in 1865. These original goldmining communities suffered discrimination due to racist ideology, the economic competition they represented to the Europeans, and because of the implied 'disloyalty' within their transient, sojourner outlook. While many believe there was a 'White New Zealand' policy similar to Australia's, New Zealand never had such a policy openly sanctioned and was open to Pacific Island immigration from its early history. However, in the 1880s, openly sinophobic political ideology, especially in the heavily Chinese city of Dunedin, resulted in the New Zealand head tax, also known as the 'Poll Tax', aimed specifically at Chinese migrants. Racist violence towards Chinese people in New Zealand followed, such as the tragic murder of Joe Kum Yung by white supremacist Lionel Kerry. This attack occurred in Haining Street in Te Aro, Wellington, on 24 September 1905, in the centre of what once was a large Chinatown. Despite official barriers the Chinese still managed to develop their communities in this period, and numbers were bolstered when some wives and children from Guangdong Province were allowed in as refugees just before World War II.

New Zealanders of Chinese descent also fought for New Zealand in World War II. During World War I, Cecil Alloo rose from the ranks to become the first commissioned officer of Chinese descent in New Zealand's armed forces. Chain migration from Guangdong continued until the new Communist Chinese regime stopped emigration. This original group of Cantonese migrants and their descendants are referred to in New Zealand as 'Old Generation' Chinese, and are now a minority within the overall Chinese population.

John Hall's government passed the Chinese Immigration Act 1881. This imposed a £10 tax per Chinese person entering New Zealand, and permitted only one Chinese immigrant for every 10 tons of cargo. Richard Seddon's government increased the tax to £100 per head in 1896, and tightened the other restriction to only one Chinese immigrant for every 200 tons of cargo.

After the Second World War (1945–1999) 

Ethnic Chinese communities from countries other than China began establishing themselves in New Zealand between the 1960s and 1980s. These included ethnic Chinese refugees from Cambodia, Vietnam and Laos following the conflicts and upheavals in those countries; Commonwealth (i.e. English educated) professional migrants from Hong Kong, Singapore and Malaysia; and Samoan Chinese as part of the substantial Pacific labour migrations of the 1970s.

Between 1987 and 1996, a fundamental change in New Zealand's immigration policy led to a substantial influx of ethnic Chinese business, investor, and professional migrants, particularly from Hong Kong and Taiwan. This period saw a spike in overall migration from the Asian region, including other Chinese people from East Asia and Southeast Asia. New Zealand's immigration system increasingly experienced the impact of global events, such as the Tiananmen Square protests of 1989 and the May 1998 riots of Indonesia in which many Chinese were affected.

Since 2000 and later discrimination 
Chinese New Zealanders by the turn of the 21st century had become a more established and integral part of New Zealand Society, with new waves of immigrants arriving from the 1970s and 80s onwards integrating into the existing legacy of Chinese who had been in the country since the mid-nineteenth century. The Chinese alongside other Asian New Zealanders now more embraced as a part of the country's cosmopolitan heritage continue to shape the culture and economy of New Zealand, this has become most notable in The Auckland Region wherein New Zealanders of all backgrounds enjoy the material aspects of Asian popular and traditional culture as normalised parts of everyday life; with the likes of Bubble Tea, Anime, and K-Pop having become mainstream parts of Youth and Urban Culture.

The Chinese in New Zealand today make up one of the country's wealthiest and most highly educated ethnic communities, with median levels of households wealth and education levels surpassing that of their White and Polynesian countrymen. They also make up a significant proportion of business owners and workers within the country's private economy, a privileged status which has at times added to historic prejudices played into by demagogic groups.

An increasing number of Chinese New Zealanders since the early 2000s have taken on key positions in government and various political institutions, with the 2020 General Elections seeing The New Zealand Parliament's share of Asian Members rise to an all-time high.

Newer Chinese immigrant arrivals are generally well-educated professionals or businesspeople with internationally transferable skills. Many have chosen to come because they want to raise their children in a less competitive educational environment, or because they want a more leisurely lifestyle and new employment opportunities.
In 2002, the New Zealand Government publicly apologised to Chinese New Zealanders for the poll tax that had been levied on their ancestors a century ago.

In 2010, Mainland China for the first time has become New Zealand's top source country for family immigration through the Family Sponsored Stream and the Partnership policy in New Zealand, as large numbers of Chinese nationals choose to study abroad in New Zealand and then gain the recognised qualifications to obtain skilled employment in New Zealand.

In the New Zealand's 2018 national census, Asian New Zealanders reached 15.5% of the country's total population an increase from 11.8% in 2013, with Chinese New Zealanders making up 36% of all peoples of Asian heritage.

During the worldwide spike in sinophobia during the COVID-19 pandemic, MP Raymond Huo was among many politicians who condemned the racial abuse suffered by the country's Chinese community. An online petition to prevent people from China from entering the country was signed by more than 18,000 people. In Canterbury, an email was sent to a Chinese-origin student's parent, which reportedly said, "our Kiwi kids don't want to be in the same class with your disgusting virus spreaders."

Mayor of Auckland Phil Goff said he was "sickened" by the reports of Asian-origin people being racially targeted at swimming pools, public transport and restaurants. In February 2021, the Chinese consulate in Auckland was affected by a phony bomb threat made by individuals on an events website Aucklife that they had hacked. Their motive was reportedly a punitive response against China for allegedly causing the pandemic.

Socioeconomics

Education

While New Zealand teachers and parents generally choose a lenient approach for children's learning, literature reveals a contrary belief and practice among Chinese immigrant parents in New Zealand, showing that they place much more value on children's academics than focusing on the playful aspects. They place importance in children’s diligence and studies, seeing it as a catapult for higher education and pursuing greater academic achievement. Chinese parents continue to uphold their Chinese Confucian cultural values and pursue academic learning for their children, while Western parents and teachers tend to follow a play and child-centered techniques. The findings show that different or even contradictory expectations and practices exist among Chinese immigrant parents. Chinese immigrant parents see education and schoolwork as the preparation, revision, and extension of children's knowledge. Learning is revered in Chinese culture. It reinforces the child's overall cognitive development during their early childhood years. Thus a sense of family obligation acts as children's extrinsic motivation to perform well academically.

A high value on education is placed among Chinese New Zealand families. Chinese New Zealanders rank the fourth highest ethnic group among Asian New Zealanders with 22 percent holding a bachelor's degree. Among New Zealand-born Chinese, 23 percent had obtained a degree comparable to 23% for Asian New Zealanders but nearly twice the national average of 12%.

Employment
Among the Asian populations, several groups had rates of labour force participation as high as, if not higher than, that of the average New Zealand population. The New Zealand-born Chinese population had high rates of participation, with 75 percent of Chinese New Zealanders participating in the workforce. Overseas-born New Zealand Chinese, who accounted for a third of the Asian population, had a labour force participation rate of 45 percent in 2001. Overseas-born Chinese people (86 percent) were slightly more likely to hold a qualification than Chinese people born in New Zealand (83 percent) New Zealand-born and overseas-born Chinese (47 percent and 44 percent, respectively) are working in selected white collar professions compared to 40% for the total New Zealand population and 43% for Asian New Zealanders. Chinese New Zealanders also register an unemployment rate lower than the national average, where overseas-born Chinese had an unemployment rate of 15% and New Zealand-born Chinese had an unemployment rate of 8%. Therefore, on average, the overall unemployment rate of 11.5% was lower than the total New Zealand population of 17%.

At the 2013 census, the largest employment industries of Chinese New Zealanders were accommodation and food services (16.0%); retail trade (13.5%); professional, scientific and technical services (11.0%); manufacturing (8.8%); and health care and social assistance (7.4%).

Economics
The Chinese in New Zealand today make up one of the country's wealthiest and most highly educated ethnic communities, with median levels of households wealth and education levels surpassing that of their White and Polynesian countrymen. They also make up a significant proportion of business owners and workers within the country's private economy, a privileged status which has at times added to historic prejudices played into by demagogic groups.

An increasing number of Chinese New Zealanders since the early 2000s have taken on key positions in government and various political institutions, with the 2020 General Elections seeing The New Zealand Parliament's share of Asian Members rise to an all-time high.

Newer Chinese immigrant arrivals are generally well-educated professionals or businesspeople with internationally transferable skills. Many have chosen to come because they want to raise their children in a less competitive educational environment, or because they want a more leisurely lifestyle and new employment opportunities.

Cuisine 
Chinese cuisine has heavily influenced New Zealand cuisine in general, with the influence heavily seen in Chinese restaurants and fish and chip shops. The latter of which are today overwhelmingly owned by New Zealanders of Chinese descent, having formerly been owned largely by Greek New Zealanders and to a lesser extent Croatians. Influence is also seen by the commonplace of Chinese-based street food, such as the blue cheese wontons that were developed in the Cuba Precinct of central Wellington.

Notable people

See also 

 Fo Guang Shan Temple, Auckland
 Chinatowns in Oceania
 Chinese Australians
 Chinese in Fiji
 Head tax (New Zealand)
 Jook-sing
 People's Republic of China–New Zealand relations
 China–New Zealand relations

References

Further reading 
Li, Phoebe H. "New Chinese Immigrants to New Zealand: A PRC Dimension" (Part IV: Chinese Migration in Other Countries: Chapter 14). "A Biographical Study of Chinese Immigrants in Belgium: Strategies for Localisation." In: Zhang, Jijiao and Howard Duncan. Migration in China and Asia: Experience and Policy (Volume 10 of International Perspectives on Migration). Springer Science & Business Media, 8 April 2014. , 9789401787598. Start p. 229.

External links 
 Entry on Chinese New Zealanders in Te Ara, the Online Dictionary of New Zealand
 Chinese historical materials from the Sir George Grey Special Collections

Asian New Zealander
 
New Zealand